Dustin Lynch is the debut studio album by the American country music artist of the same name. It was released on August 21, 2012 by Broken Bow Records. Lynch wrote or co-wrote ten of the album's thirteen tracks, including the first single, "Cowboys and Angels". The album's second single, "She Cranks My Tractor", was released to country radio on November 19, 2012. The album has sold 100,000 copies as of December 2012. The album's third single, "Wild in Your Smile", was released to country radio on May 27, 2013.

Critical reception
Giving it 3 stars out of 5, Bobby Peacock of Roughstock praised the "uncluttered, often soft production" and Lynch's voice, but thought that the latter half of the album contained too many songs about partying. An identical rating came from Billy Dukes of Taste of Country, who said that "His more pensive, thought-provoking lyrics stand out above the party songs."

Track listing

Personnel
Adapted from AllMusic.

 Kurt Allison – electric guitar
 Kelly Archer – background vocals
 Brett Beavers – keyboards, hand claps, programming
 Jimmy Carter – bass guitar
 Kory Caudill – string programming
 Perry Coleman – background vocals
 J. T. Corenflos – electric guitar
 Ray Driskoll – hand claps
 Jared Evans – hand claps
 Larry Franklin – fiddle
 Tommy Harden – drums, percussion
 Mike Johnson – steel guitar
 Tully Kennedy – bass guitar
 Dustin Lynch – lead vocals, background vocals, hand claps
 Rob McNelley – electric guitar
 Jerry McPherson – electric guitar
 Greg Magnum – hand claps
 Alena Moran – hand claps
 Tony Pierce – electric guitar, background vocals
 Mike Rojas – keyboards
 Jason Severs – background vocals
 Steven Sheehan – acoustic guitar
 Nick Spezia – hand claps
 Russell Terrell – background vocals
 Ilya Toshinsky – banjo, acoustic guitar
 Luke Wooten – electric guitar, hand claps, background vocals

Charts

Weekly charts

Year-end charts

Singles

References

2012 debut albums
Dustin Lynch albums
BBR Music Group albums
Albums produced by Brett Beavers